Great British Garden Revival is a British documentary television series that was first broadcast on BBC Two on 9 December 2013. The series was presented by Monty Don, Carol Klein, Joe Swift, Rachel De Thame, James Wong, Tom Hart Dyke, Chris Beardshaw, Alys Fowler, Charlie Dimmock, Diarmuid Gavin, Christine Walkden, Toby Buckland, Sarah Raven and Matt James. Each episode shows two presenters focusing on an endangered part of gardens.

A second series aired on 6–21 January 2015

Production
Great British Garden Revival was commissioned by Lindsay Bradbury of BBC Daytime and executive produced by Bridget Boseley. The series consists of ten episodes and was made by Outline Productions for BBC Two. The series was developed by Ross McCarthy, Outline Productions' head of development and Helen Veale, creative director. Great British Garden Revival was distributed by Hat Trick International at Mipcom.

Episode list (Series 1)

References

External links
 
 

2013 British television series debuts
2015 British television series endings
Television shows set in the United Kingdom
BBC television documentaries
English-language television shows